Vaishali Lok Sabha constituency is one of the 40 Lok Sabha constituencies in Bihar state in eastern India. The first Member of Parliament was Digvijay Narain Singh, while the first woman MP to represent the constituency in Lok Sabha was Kishori Sinha.

Assembly segments
Vaishali Lok Sabha constituency comprises the following six Vidhan Sabha (legislative assembly) segments:

Members of Parliament

^ by-poll

Election results

General elections 2019

General elections 2014

General elections 2009

See also
 Muzaffarpur district
 List of Constituencies of the Lok Sabha

References

Lok Sabha constituencies in Bihar
Politics of Vaishali district
Politics of Muzaffarpur district